Three Ring Circus, or variations, may refer to

 Three-ring circus, a type of circus
 3 Ring Circus, a 1954 American comedy film
 "Three Ring Circus", a 1977 song by Barry Biggs
 "Three Ring Circus", a 1974 song by Blue Magic
 "Three Ring Circus", a song by Beady Eye song from the 2011 album Different Gear, Still Speeding
3 Ring Circus - Live at The Palace, a 2013 live album recorded in 1995 by Sublime

See also

 Two Ring Circus (disambiguation)
 Circus (disambiguation)